Lodgepole can refer to:
Towns or cities
 Lodgepole, Alberta, a hamlet in Canada
 Lodge Pole, Montana, census-designated place in the United States
 Lodgepole, Nebraska, a village in the United States
 Lodgepole, South Dakota, an unincorporated community in the United States

Species
 Lodgepole chipmunk, a species of rodent
  Lodgepole pine a species of tree

Creeks or lakes
 Lodgepole Creek, a creek within Colorado, Nebraska and Wyoming in the United States
 Lodgepole Lake, a lake in Idaho, United States

Other
 Lodgepole (sculpture), a sculpture by Lyman Kipp
 Lodgepole Community Hall, a National Registered Historic Place